Jens Schmidt (born 18 February 1981) is a German international rugby union player, playing for the TSV Handschuhsheim in the Rugby-Bundesliga and the German national rugby union team. He was, until 2009, the captain of the German team, but then retired from international rugby, to return once more in 2010.

Biography
Jens Schmidt begun playing rugby when he was nine years old in 1990.

Throughout his career, he played for the TSV Handschuhsheim, except when he spent one year with the French professional club FC Auch Gers in 2001.

He has won the German rugby union cup twice with his team, TSV Handschuhsheim, in 2005 and 2008. His greatest success as a national team player was the promotion to Division 1 of the European Nations Cup in 2008.

He made his 35th international for Germany in the game against Spain on 15 November 2008 and made his last appearance for his country against Portugal on 21 February 2009, his 38th cap. He returned briefly to the team for the all-important relegation decider against Spain on 20 March 2010 but remained an unused substitute.

Schmidt is a teacher by profession.

Honours

Club
 German rugby union championship
 Runners up: 2005
 German rugby union cup
 Winner: 2005, 2008

National team
 European Nations Cup – Division 2
 Champions: 2008

Stats
Jens Schmidt's personal statistics in club and international rugby:

Club

 As of 30 April 2012

National team

European Nations Cup

Friendlies & other competitions

 As of 8 April 2012

References

External links
  Jens Schmidt profile at totalrugby.de
  Härte, Herzblut, Hoffnung Frankfurter Allgemeine – Article on Jens Schmidt
  Jens Schmidt at the DRV website

1981 births
Living people
German rugby union players
Germany international rugby union players
Expatriate rugby union players in France
TSV Handschuhsheim players
Rugby union locks
German expatriate rugby union players
German expatriate sportspeople in France